The energy system of Iran relies primarily on fossil fuels. However, the country has made steps to decrease its dependency on fossil fuels by investing in wind power. 

With the help from Sadid Industrial Group (Iranian manufacturing company) and investments as well as resources from Indian (Sulzon Energy) and German (Siemens) wind turbine companies, Iran has been able to build a strong and stable wind sector. 
In 2004 Iran generated only 25 megawatts from wind power, 32 megawatts in 2005, and 45 megawatts in 2006. 
By 2009, total wind power capacity reached 130 megawatts. This was a result of the production of larger wind farms in more coastal and windy areas of Iran, such as Manjeel (Gilan province) and Binaloud (Razavi Khorasan Province).

See also

Manjil and Rudbar Wind Farm
Binalood wind farm
Iran–Armenia Wind Farm
Energy of Iran
List of power stations in Iran
International Persian Group - IPG
Renewable energy in Iran
Renewable energy by country

References

 F., F., N., S., S., S., & M.A., R. (2015). Assessment of wind energy potential and economics in the north-western Iranian cities of Tabriz and Ardabil. Renewable and Sustainable Energy Reviews, v45, 87-99.
 Fatemeh Rahimzadeh Affiliation: Atmospheric Science and Meteorological Research Center (ASMERC), T. I., & Affiliation:, A. M. (2011). Wind speed variability over Iran and its impact on wind power potential: a case study for Esfehan Province. Meteorological Applications, v18 n2, 198-210.
 Gholamhassan Najafi Affiliation: Tarbiat Modares University, P. B.-1., & Barat Ghobadian Affiliation: Tarbiat Modares University, P. B.-1. (2015). LLK1694-wind energy resources and development in Iran. Renewable and Sustainable Energy Reviews, v15 n6, 2719-2728.
 Julien Mercille Affiliation: School of Geography, P. a., & Alun Jones Affiliation: School of Geography, P. a. (2009). Practicing Radical Geopolitics: Logics of Power and the Iranian Nuclear “Crisis”. Annals of the Association of American Geographers, v99 n5, 856-862.
 Kasra Mohammadi Affiliation: Department of Mechanical and Industrial Engineering, U. o., Ali Mostafaeipour Affiliation: Industrial Engineering Department, Y. U., & Affiliat, A. S. (2009). Application and economic viability of wind turbine installation in Lutak, Iran. Environmental Earth Sciences, v75 n3, 1-16.
 Sayed Moslem Mousavi Affiliation: Sharif University of Technology, I., & Morteza Bagheri Ghanbarabadi Affiliation: Sharif University of Technology, I. (2015). The competitiveness of wind power compared to existing methods of electricity generation in Iran. Energy Policy, v42 (201203), 651-656.
 Wyn Q Bowen Affiliation: Defence Studies Department, K. C., & London, J. K. (2004). The Iranian Nuclear Challenge. International Affairs, v80 n2, 257-276.

External links

Renewable Energy Organization of Iran